The conga is a Cuban drum.

Conga may also refer to:

Places
 Co’nga, a village in Tibet

Arts and entertainment 
 Conga (music), a Cuban music genre and ensemble
 Conga line, a novelty dance derived from the music genre
 "Conga" (song), a 1985 single by Miami Sound Machine sung by Gloria Estefan
 Chinchón (card game), called "La Conga" or "Conga" in Uruguay

Other uses 
 Conga (skipper), a genus of butterfly
 Apttus Corporation, a business-to-business software provider now trading as Conga

See also 
 Conger (disambiguation)
 Congo (disambiguation)